Nachit-e Kuranlu (also Romanized as Nāchīt-e Kūrānlū; also known as Nāchīt) is a village in Charuymaq-e Jonubesharqi Rural District, Shadian District, Charuymaq County, East Azerbaijan Province, Iran. At the 2006 census, its population was 244, in 39 families.

Name 
According to Vladimir Minorsky, the name "Nachid" is derived from Mongolian and means "falcons".

References 

Populated places in Charuymaq County